Erik Ohlsson (born 2 July 1975 in Örebro, Sweden) is the lead and rhythm guitarist of Swedish punk rock band Millencolin. He currently resides in Örebro, Sweden. He designs almost all of the band's artwork, including their t-shirts, logos, cover artwork, and their official homepage. Ohlsson edited and designed Millencolin's 1998 video Millencolin and the Hi-8 Adventures. He also works as a freelance graphic designer at Eckhouse Design. He still skateboards from time to time, but like the other two members of Millencolin who skate (Nikola Sarcevic and Mathias Färm), the time available to do so has been taken up by various side projects. He has a dog named Colin.
In the early albums of the band, he played most of the lead guitars. However, in the band's more recent albums, he plays most of rhythm guitar parts, and usually the main solos. He can be seen doing so in their latest live concerts or watching in YouTube their last presentations.

References

External links 
 NYROCK - August 2000 interview
 MacDesktop interview - mirror of interview with MacDesktop.com

1975 births
Living people
Swedish punk rock musicians
21st-century guitarists